Basilica of St. Mary may refer to:

Italy 
Basilica of Santa Maria degli Angeli, Assisi
Basilica di Santa Maria dei Servi, Bologna
Basilica of Santa Maria Novella, Florence
Santa Maria di Collemaggio, L'Aquila
Basilica di Santa Maria Maggiore, Rome
Santa Maria Ausiliatrice, Rome
Santa Maria degli Angeli e dei Martiri, Rome
Santa Maria del Popolo, Rome
Santa Maria della Scala, Rome
Santa Maria della Vittoria, Rome
Santa Maria in Aquiro, Rome
Santa Maria in Ara Coeli, Rome
Santa Maria in Campitelli, Rome
Santa Maria in Cosmedin, Rome
Santa Maria in Domnica, Rome
Santa Maria in Traspontina, Rome
Santa Maria in Trastevere, Rome
Santa Maria in Via Lata, Rome
Santa Maria in Via, Rome
Santa Maria sopra Minerva, Rome
Basilica of Our Lady Help of Christians, Turin
Frari (Basilica di Santa Maria Gloriosa dei Frari), Venice
Santa Maria della Salute, Venice
Torcello Cathedral, Torcello, Venice

Spain 
Santa Maria de Montserrat
Basilica of Santa Maria, Alicante, Alicante
Santa Maria del Mar, Barcelona, Barcelona
Basilica of Santa Maria, Igualada, Igualada
Santa Maria de Manresa, Manresa
Saint Mary of Valencia Cathedral, Valencia

U.S. 
St. Mary's Basilica (Phoenix), Arizona
Basilica of Saint Mary (Minneapolis), Minnesota
St. Mary Basilica, Natchez, Mississippi
St. Mary of the Angels Basilica (Olean, New York)
Basilica Shrine of St. Mary (Wilmington, North Carolina)
Basilica of St. Mary of the Assumption (Marietta, Ohio)
St. Mary Cathedral Basilica (Galveston, Texas)
Basilica of St. Mary (Alexandria, Virginia)
Basilica of Saint Mary of the Immaculate Conception (Norfolk, Virginia)

Elsewhere 
St. Mary's Basilica, Halifax, Canada
St. Mary's Basilica, Bangalore, India
St. Mary's Cathedral Basilica, Ernakulam, India
St. Mary's Basilica, Invercargill, New Zealand
St. Mary's Church, Gdańsk, Poland
St. Mary's Basilica, Kraków, Poland

See also 
 Basilica of Our Lady of the Angels (disambiguation)
 Cathedral of Saint Mary of the Immaculate Conception (disambiguation)
 Saint Mary's Church (disambiguation)